KidVision was a children's home video division of A*Vision Entertainment, later WarnerVision Entertainment. It was launched in 1992 and started distributing videos on the January of 1993 with The Magic School Bus, The Puzzle Place, Shining Time Station, Kidsongs and the Real Wheels and Real Animals series. In 1995, with WarnerVision Entertainment's pact with Dualstar Video, luring away from BMG Kidz, they picked up the Mary-Kate & Ashley titles.

On July 29, 1997, KidVision moved under Warner Home Video, and continued to distribute Magic School Bus videos until October 8, 2002.

It was also the Warner Music Group division that was distributed by Warner Bros.’ Family Entertainment unit.

Video Releases 
 Shining Time Station (1993–1994)
 Real Wheels (There Goes A... & Rockin' Real Wheels) (1993–1997)
 The Adventures of Mary-Kate & Ashley (1994–1997)
 Real Animals (1994–1998)
 The Magic School Bus (1994–2002)
 Kidsongs (1995)
 You're Invited to Mary-Kate & Ashley's (1995–1997)
 Baby Goes... (1995)
 Dream Big (1995)
 Fay Presents (1995)
 NASCAR For Kids (1995)
 Kathie Lee's Rock n' Tots Cafe (1995)
 Gumby: The Movie (1995)

References 

Home video companies of the United States
Companies established in 1992
Companies disestablished in 2004
Warner Music labels
Former Time Warner subsidiaries